"Awake and Alive" is the third single of the 2009 album Awake  by the Christian rock band Skillet and is the fourth track on the album. It was released on February 15, 2010, to Christian Hard rock and Rock radio. Before release as a single, the song charted at No. 100 in the Billboard Hot 100 for one week and No. 16 on the Billboard Top Heatseekers after the release of Awake thanks to digital sales, becoming Skillet's first song to hit the Hot 100. The song also charted at No. 1 on Christian Rock.net. It has also debuted on Christian Rock charts at No. 12.

Track listing
"Awake and Alive"

Music video 
The music video consists of the band playing the song live on stage. The video also features clips of the band backstage, and even some clips from some of their podcasts.

Meaning

When asked about the meaning of the song by Stereotruth.net, John Cooper (the lead singer of the band) had the following to say: "Tying in with 'Hero,' here's one about feeling like you're falling under from all the stresses of life. Even though you feel like everyone around you is trying to take your hope away from you, no one has the right to do that and you shouldn't allow those negative influences to weigh you down. Live what you believe and don't be afraid to stand up for your faith."

Charts

Weekly charts

Year-end charts

Certifications

Credits
 John Cooper – lead vocals, bass guitar
 Korey Cooper – rhythm guitar, keyboards
 Ben Kasica – lead guitar
 Jen Ledger – drums, vocals
 Tate Olsen – cello
 Jonathan Chu – violin

Usage

The song was used for the November 2009 promo for the soap opera One Life to Live. The song also appeared on the Transformers: Dark of the Moon Soundtrack.

On August 6, 2011, Rays Third baseman Evan Longoria used the song as his walk-up music for his second at-bat.

In 2014, Cincinnati Reds Pitcher JJ Hoover used this song as his walk in song when coming in from the bullpen.

The song was also used in the compilation album WOW Hits 2012.

References

Skillet (band) songs
2010 singles
Songs written by Brian Howes
Songs written by John Cooper (musician)
Song recordings produced by Howard Benson
Atlantic Records singles
2009 songs
Lava Records singles
Ardent Records singles
Symphonic metal songs